Varstu Airfield (ICAO: EEVU) is an airfield in Varstu, Võru County, Estonia.

The airfield was built in 1976 or 1977 by Soviet Union. The airfield was used for agricultural activities. In the beginning of 1990s, the airfield was abandoned. The airfield was officially re-opened in 2008.

References

External links
 Varstu Airfield at Forgotten Airfields

Defunct airports in Estonia
Buildings and structures in Tartu County
Rõuge Parish